The Diocese of Salto is a Latin Church ecclesiastical territory or diocese of the Catholic Church in Uruguay. The diocese was erected in 1897. The Diocese of Salto covers four departments: Artigas, Salto, Paysandú, and Río Negro. Its see is at the Cathedral of Salto.

The Diocese of Salto is a suffragan diocese of the ecclesiastical province of the metropolitan Archdiocese of Montevideo. The current bishop is Arturo Eduardo Fajardo Bustamante, who was appointed in 15 June 2020, transferring him from the Diocese of San José de Mayo.

Bishops
Ordinaries
 Tomás Gregorio Camacho † (3 Jul 1919 Appointed – 20 May 1940 Died) 
 Alfredo Viola † (20 May 1940 Succeeded – 1 Jan 1968 Resigned) 
 Marcelo Mendiharat Pommies † (1 Jan 1968 Succeeded – 8 Mar 1989 Retired) 
 Daniel Gil Zorrilla, S.J. † (8 Mar 1989 Appointed – 16 May 2006 Retired) 
 Pablo Jaime Galimberti di Vietri (16 May 2006 Appointed –  24 Jul 2018 Retired)
 Fernando Miguel Gil Eisner † (24 Jul 2018 Appointed – 17 Jan 2020 Died)
 Arturo Eduardo Fajardo Bustamante (15 June 2020 Appointed – )

Auxiliary and co-adjutor bishops
 Alfredo Viola † (co-adjutor, 25 July 1936 – 20 May 1940)
 José María Cavallero † (auxiliary, 16 July 1952 – 20 December 1955), appointed Bishop of Melo
 Marcelo Mendiharat Pommies † (co-adjutor, 3 February 1959 – 1 January 1968)
 Carlos Alberto Nicolini † (auxiliary, since 28 October 1977; co-adjutor, 29 December 1984 – 19 June 1988), died without succeeding to see
 Heriberto Bodeant (auxiliary, 28 June 2003 – 13 June 2009), appointed Bishop of Melo

Other priest of this diocese who became bishop
Francisco Domingo Barbosa Da Silveira † , appointed Bishop of Minas in 2004

See also
List of churches in the Diocese of Salto
List of Roman Catholic dioceses in Uruguay

External links
 

Religion in Salto Department
Religion in Artigas Department
Religion in Río Negro Department
Religion in Paysandú Department
Salto
Salto
Religious organizations established in 1897
1897 establishments in Uruguay
Salto